Jorge Alves da Silva (born 23 February 1946), known as just Jorge, is a Brazilian footballer. He competed in the men's tournament at the 1968 Summer Olympics.

References

External links
 

1946 births
Living people
Brazilian footballers
Brazil international footballers
Olympic footballers of Brazil
Footballers at the 1968 Summer Olympics
Footballers from São Paulo
Association footballers not categorized by position